Kalevi Johannes Lahdenranta (born 20 March 1942) is a retired Finnish weightlifter. He competed at the 1968 and 1972 Summer Olympics in the heavyweight and super heavyweight categories, respectively, and finished in seventh place in both games. In 1970, he won a bronze and a silver medal at the world and European championships. He set four world records in the snatch between 1970 and 1974.

References

External links
 
 Kalevi Lahdenranta. kerromuseolle.fi (images)

1942 births
Living people
Finnish male weightlifters
Olympic weightlifters of Finland
Weightlifters at the 1968 Summer Olympics
Weightlifters at the 1972 Summer Olympics
People from Kankaanpää
European Weightlifting Championships medalists
Sportspeople from Satakunta
20th-century Finnish people
21st-century Finnish people